Electrical pacing may refer to:

Medicine
Transcutaneous pacing
Transvenous pacing
Epicardial pacing